Other Channels is the debut album by Cate Brooks, under the pseudonym of The Advisory Circle. It was preceded by the mini-album Mind How You Go. The album was released on 10 March 2008 on the Ghost Box label.

Track listing

External links
 Ghost Box page

The Advisory Circle albums
Ghost Box Music albums
2008 debut albums